Grand Theater station, formerly Dajuyuan is a station on Line 1 and Line 2 of the Shenzhen Metro. The Line 1 platforms opened on 28 December 2004 and the Line 2 platforms opened on 28 June 2011. It is located underneath the junction of Shennan Donglu and Jiefang Road in the Luohu District of Shenzhen, China. The station takes its name from the Shenzhen Grand Theater. It is the closest station to The MixC (a major luxury shopping mall) and the Shenzhen Book City. It is an interchange station between Lines 1 and 2, and an indirect interchange with Line 9 at Hongling South Station.

Station layout

Exits

References

External links
 Shenzhen Metro Grand Theater Station (Line 1)  (Chinese)
 Shenzhen Metro Grand Theater Station (Line 1)  (English)
 Shenzhen Metro Grand Theater Station (Line 2) (Chinese)
 Shenzhen Metro Grand Theater Station (Line 2)  (English)

Railway stations in Guangdong
Shenzhen Metro stations
Luohu District
Railway stations in China opened in 2004
Railway stations located underground in China